Baix Camp is a comarca of Catalonia. It is one of the three comarques into which Camp de Tarragona was divided in the comarcal division of 1936.

Baix Camp is located on the coast, between Tarragonès to the northeast and Baix Ebre to the south. It also borders the comarques of Priorat, Ribera d'Ebre, Conca de Barberà, Alt Camp, and Tarragonès.

Population 
Almost 150,000 people inhabit Baix Camp. The population has increased gently since the middle of the twentieth century, with population growth averaging 1.5% annually during the last three decades. Growth is not evenly distributed, however, but is strongly focused on Reus, the industrial and commercial centre of the region. Around two-thirds of the inhabitants of Baix Camp live in Reus, which from the seventeenth to the nineteenth centuries was the second most populous city in Catalonia, after Barcelona. Taking Catalonia as a whole, the place of Reus in the population rankings has now slipped to tenth. Within Baix Camp, the only other municipality with more than 10,000 inhabitants is Cambrils.

Economy 
In the agricultural sector almonds and hazelnuts are a major crops, together representing 30% of primary sector production.   Viticulture has never regained the level of dominance that it enjoyed before the European Phylloxera epidemic that peaked in the 1870s.   High dependency on almonds and hazelnuts nevertheless leaves the entire regional economy vulnerable to declining world market prices that have accompanied increased globalization of the agricultural sector.   Some price protection is afforded to growers by protected designation for "Hazelnuts from Reus" which actually covers not just production from Reus but also that from neighboring Alt Camp, Tarragonès, Priorat, Conca de Barberà and Terra Alta.

Municipalities 
After the capital Reus, the major cities are Cambrils and Mont-roig del Camp; other significant towns are Riudoms and Selva del Camp.

Smaller municipalities:
 North of Reus, at the foot of Puig d'en Cama: Castellvell del Camp and Almoster.
 In the Mountains of Prades: Prades, Capafonts, Arbolí, and l'Albiol.
 In the valley of the river Maspujols: Vilaplana, l'Aleixar, and Maspujols.
 In the valley of the river Alforja: Alforja, les Borges del Camp, and Vinyols i els Arcs.
 Between the ranges of Puig Marí and Puig-server: Riudecols.
 In the valley of the ravine of Ànima Blanca: Montbrió del Camp, and Botarell.
 Near Mont-roig del Camp: Vilanova d'Escornalbou, Colldejou, and la Torre de Fontaubella
 At the western edge of the comarca: Pratdip and the municipality of Vandellòs i l'Hospitalet de l'Infant.

List of municipalities

References

External links 
 Official comarcal web site (in Catalan)

 
Comarques of the Province of Tarragona